The Sounds of Tomorrow is a Man or Astro-man? 7" EP released on Estrus Records in 1996. It was released on both black vinyl and gray vinyl.

Unit Test Tracks

Test A
"The Evil Sounds of Planet Spectra"
"The Wayward Meteor"

Test B
"Green-Blooded Love" (Thee Shatners)
"The Powerful Transisitorized Dick Tracy Two-Way Wrist Radio"

Line Up
Star Crunch: inner mind multi-wave guitar vibration
Birdstuff: tempomatic rythmo-lock
Coco the Electronic Monkey Wizard: distortomated mega frequency lo-out, transmonosonic impedance overload
Dexter X - Man from Planet Q: Vacuum silence

References

Man or Astro-man? EPs
1996 EPs